Potamonautidae is a family of freshwater crabs endemic to Africa, including the islands of Madagascar, the Seychelles, Zanzibar, Mafia, Pemba, Bioko, São Tomé, Príncipe and Sherbro Island. It comprises 18 extant genera and 138 extant species. Fossil remains dating from the Late Miocene period have been attributed to the family Potamonautidae.

It comprises the following subfamilies and genera:

Deckeniinae Ortmann, 1897
Deckenia Hilgendorf, 1869
Seychellum Ng, Števčić & Pretzmann, 1995
Hydrothelphusinae Bott, 1955
Afrithelphusa Bott, 1969
Boreas Cumberlidge & von Sternberg, 2002
Globonautes Bott, 1959
Hydrothelphusa A. Milne-Edwards, 1872
Louisea Cumberlidge, 1994
Madagapotamon Bott, 1965
Malagasya Cumberlidge & von Sternberg, 2002
Marojejy Cumberlidge, Boyko & Harvey, 2002
Skelosophusa Ng & Takeda, 1994
Potamonautinae Bott, 1970
Erimetopus Rathbun, 1894
Foza Dai & Bo, 1994
Liberonautes Bott, 1955
Platythelphusa A. Milne-Edwards, 1887
Potamonautes MacLeay, 1838
Potamonemus Cumberlidge & P. F. Clark, 1992
Sudanonautes Bott, 1955
Tanzanonautes † Feldmann et al., 2007

References

Potamoidea
Freshwater crustaceans of Africa
Decapod families